Indirect presidential elections were held in Trinidad and Tobago on 19 January 2018.

On 5 January 2018, the name of Paula-Mae Weekes, a judge of the Turks and Caicos Islands Court of Appeal, was put forward by the PNM government of Prime Minister Keith Rowley in hopes of reaching a consensus with the UNC-led parliamentary opposition of Kamla Persad-Bissessar, which later indeed endorsed her nomination as well. As Weekes was the only nominated candidate on election day, she was deemed elected without the need for a vote. Paula-Mae Weeks thus became the first woman to take office as president of Trinidad and Tobago on 19 March 2018.

Electoral method
The President of Trinidad and Tobago is indirectly elected for a 5-year term by an electoral college comprising all 41 members of the House of Representatives and all 31 members of the Senate.

To win the election a candidate must gain a plurality of votes cast, whereby a quorum comprising the Speaker of the House of Representatives, 10 Senators and 12 other member of the House of Representatives must be met for the election to be considered valid. If only one candidate should be nominated to run in the election, he or she shall be considered to have been elected president without the need for a vote to take place.

Candidates

Nominated by the Government
Paula-Mae Weekes, Judge of the Turks and Caicos Islands Court of Appeals

Electoral College

Partisan make-up of the Electoral College

Results of the election held on 19 January 2018

References

2018 elections in the Caribbean
2018
Election, Presidential
Uncontested elections